"You Are the Girl" is a 1987 song by the Cars, from their album Door to Door. It was released as a single in August 1987, reaching number 17 on the Billboard Hot 100. It also reached number 2 on the Mainstream Rock Tracks chart, and number 12 on the Adult Contemporary chart. It was the Cars' 13th and final Top 40 hit.

Background
Rhythm guitarist and principal songwriter Ric Ocasek shares lead vocals with bassist Benjamin Orr on "You Are the Girl".
Both singers had recently cracked the Top 40 with solo hits, Ocasek with 1986's "Emotion in Motion" and Orr with 1987's "Stay the Night". "You Are the Girl" was the Cars' first—and last—Top 40 hit after their 1987 regrouping following the band members' three-year hiatus to focus on solo work. It also became the second (and last) single after "Since I Held You" from "Candy-O" in which both singers shared vocals on a song.

The lyrics for the song are about an ex; the music video, directed by cult filmmaker John Waters, has been described as "alien-populated". In 1987, the Cars performed "You Are the Girl" and "Double Trouble" (another track from Door to Door) at the MTV Video Music Awards.

Cash Box called it a "likeable pop tune" with "slick production values."

Aftermath
The song was recorded for what would be the band's final studio album for the next 25 years, and last with its five original members, 1987's Door to Door. It was recorded at a time of personal conflict between the band members that led to their eventual disbanding.
Following the release of the album, there was public speculation that the band was breaking up, and within a year the Cars announced that they had disbanded.

Although "You Are the Girl" was the Cars' last Top 40 hit, two more singles released from Door to Door did reach the Top 100: 1987's "Strap Me In" (number 85) and 1988's "Coming Up You" (number 74).

Charts

References

The Cars songs
1987 singles
Song recordings produced by Ric Ocasek
Songs written by Ric Ocasek
Elektra Records singles